Lilies Handayani (born 15 April 1965 in Surabaya) is an Indonesian archer who won the first ever Olympic medal for Indonesia.

Together with Nurfitriyana Saiman and Kusuma Wardhani she won the silver medal in the team competition at the 1988 Summer Olympics in Seoul. Her career continued to soar until 2008 she stopped and focused on became a coach and managed the archery school she had pioneered before.

Lilies Handayani's Archery School
Lilies Handayani together with her husband Denny Trisyanto build an archery school named Lilies Handayani Srikandi Archery School (LHSAS).
It is located in Surabaya.

In popular culture
Portrayed by Chelsea Islan in the 2016 Indonesian film 3 Srikandi.

References

External links
Sports-reference.com

1965 births
Living people
Indonesian female archers
Olympic archers of Indonesia
Archers at the 1988 Summer Olympics
Olympic silver medalists for Indonesia
Sportspeople from Surabaya
Olympic medalists in archery
Medalists at the 1988 Summer Olympics
Southeast Asian Games gold medalists for Indonesia
Southeast Asian Games medalists in archery
Competitors at the 2005 Southeast Asian Games
20th-century Indonesian women
21st-century Indonesian women